Mrzlo Polje is a small settlement in the Municipality of Ivančna Gorica in central Slovenia. It lies south of Ivančna Gorica, just south of the A2 motorway in the historical region of Lower Carniola. The municipality is part of the Central Slovenia Statistical Region.

References

External links

Mrzlo Polje on Geopedia

Populated places in the Municipality of Ivančna Gorica